Springfield Mall station is a SEPTA Route 101 trolley stop in Springfield Township, Delaware County, Pennsylvania. It is located on Sproul Road (PA 320) behind the parking lot of Springfield Mall. It is also located below the embankment of the Sproul Road Bridge, which crosses over the Route 101 trolley line.

Trolleys arriving at this station travel between 69th Street Terminal in Upper Darby, Pennsylvania and Orange Street in Media, Pennsylvania. The station has an acrylic glass bus shelter where people can go inside when it is raining. It also has free parking, and a staircase leading to and from the Sproul Road Bridge. It was previously known strictly as Sproul Road station until the Springfield Mall was built in 1974. The station itself can be found on a hill below the back parking lot of the mall and has a single track as it enters Smedley County Park, and then becomes a two-track line again before crossing Pine Ridge Road.

Station layout

External links

 Station from Sproul Road from Google Maps Street View

SEPTA Media–Sharon Hill Line stations